Mohammad Arafat (born 10 December 1994) is a Bangladeshi cricketer. He made his first-class debut for Rangpur Division in the 2015–16 National Cricket League on 13 April 2017. He made his Twenty20 debut for Prime Doleshwar Sporting Club in the 2018–19 Dhaka Premier Division Twenty20 Cricket League on 25 February 2019.

References

External links
 

1994 births
Living people
Bangladeshi cricketers
Prime Doleshwar Sporting Club cricketers
Rangpur Division cricketers
Victoria Sporting Club cricketers
People from Faridpur District